A pantropical ("all tropics") distribution is one which covers tropical regions of both hemispheres. Examples of species include caecilians, modern sirenians and the plant genera Acacia and Bacopa.

Neotropical is a zoogeographic term that covers a large part of the Americas, roughly from Mexico and the Caribbean southwards (including cold regions in southernmost South America). 

Palaeotropical refers to geographical occurrence. For a distribution to be palaeotropical a taxon must occur in tropical regions in the Old World.

According to Takhtajan (1978), the following families have a pantropical distribution: 
Annonaceae, Hernandiaceae, Lauraceae, Piperaceae, Urticaceae, Dilleniaceae, Tetrameristaceae, Passifloraceae, Bombacaceae, Euphorbiaceae, Rhizophoraceae, Myrtaceae, Anacardiaceae, Sapindaceae, Malpighiaceae, Proteaceae, Bignoniaceae, Orchidaceae and Arecaceae.

See also
 Afrotropical realm
 Tropical Africa
 Tropical Asia

References

Tropics
Biogeography